Maarrat al-Numan Subdistrict  is a Syrian nahiyah (subdistrict) located in Maarat al-Numan District in Idlib. According to the Syria Central Bureau of Statistics (CBS), Maarat al-Numan Subdistrict had a population of 149834 in the 2004 census.

References 

Subdistricts of Idlib Governorate